Mariela Moreira Castedo (born 24 March 1983) is a Bolivian footballer who plays as a centre back for Mundo Futuro. She has been a member of the Bolivia women's national team.

Early life
Moreira hails from Santa Cruz Department.

International career
Moreira capped for Bolivia at senior level during the 2010 South American Women's Football Championship.

References

1983 births
Living people
Bolivian women's footballers
Bolivia women's international footballers
Women's association football central defenders
People from Santa Cruz Department (Bolivia)